Arshak II is the first Armenian classical opera, written by Tigran Chukhajian and Tovmas Terzian in 1868. Its libretto is based on historical reports about King Arsaces II (Arshak II), written by Movses Khorenatsi and Pavstos Buzand.

"Arshak II" is the first “Armenian grand opera” with choruses and ballets. It was partially staged in 1873, assembled on November 29, 1945, at the Armenian Opera Theater in Yerevan and was awarded by the USSR State Prize in 1946. Arshak II is a "gem" of Armenian musical culture. In 2001, it was staged at the San Francisco Opera. Pavel Lisitsian, Mihran Yerkat, Tigran Levonyan were among the performers of Arshak's role.

Recordings
Aria 'Arshak 's Arioso' on Arias of Love & Sorrow Gevorg Hakobyan (baritone), Kaunas Symphony Orchestra, John Fisher, Constantine Orbelian Delos 2023

Sources
Arshak II

Operas
1868 operas
Armenian-language operas
Operas based on real people
Cultural depictions of kings
Operas set in antiquity
Compositions by Tigran Chukhajian